An interior ministry (sometimes called a ministry of internal affairs or ministry of home affairs) is a government department that is responsible for internal affairs.

Lists of current ministries of internal affairs

Named "ministry" 
 Ministry of Internal Affairs (Adygea)
 Ministry of Interior Affairs (Afghanistan)
 Ministry of Internal Affairs (Albania)
 Ministry of Internal Affairs (Altai Republic)
 Ministry of the Interior (Argentina)
 Ministry of the Interior (Austria)
 Ministry of Internal Affairs (Azerbaijan)
 Ministry of Interior (Bahrain)
 Ministry of Home Affairs (Bangladesh)
 Ministry of Public Administration (Bangladesh)
 Ministry of Internal Affairs (Bashkortostan)
 Ministry of Internal Affairs (Belarus)
 Ministry of Home Affairs (Bermuda)
 Ministry of Home and Cultural Affairs (Bhutan)
 Federal Ministry of Interior (Federation of Bosnia and Herzegovina)
 Ministry of Justice and Public Security (Brazil)
 Ministry of Integration and Regional Development (Brazil)
 Ministry of Home Affairs (Brunei)
 Ministry of Interior (Bulgaria)
 Ministry of Public Security of Burundi
 Ministry of Internal Affairs (Buryatia)
 Ministry of Interior (Cambodia)
 Ministry of Internal Affairs (Chechnya)
 Ministry of the Interior and Public Security (Chile)
 Ministry of Civil Affairs (China)
 Ministry of Public Security (China)
 Ministry of Internal Affairs (Chuvashia)
 Ministry of the Interior (Colombia)
 Ministry of the Interior and Security (Democratic Republic of the Congo)
 Ministry of Internal Affairs (Crimea)
 Ministry of the Interior (Croatia)
 Ministry of Public Administration (Croatia)
 Ministry of the Interior (Cuba)
 Ministry of the Interior (Czech Republic)
 Ministry of Internal Affairs (Dagestan)
 Ministry of the Interior (Denmark)
 Ministry of the Interior (El Salvador)
 Ministry of the Interior (Estonia)
 Ministry of Interior (Egypt)
 Ministry of the Interior (Finland)
 Ministry of Internal Affairs of Georgia
 Federal Ministry of the Interior, Building and Community (Germany)
 Ministry of Interior (Ghana)
 Ministry of the Interior (Greece) 
 Ministry of Citizen Protection (Greece) 
 Ministry of the Interior (Guatemala)
 Ministry of Interior and Territorial Communities (Haiti)
 Ministry of Interior (Hungary)
 Ministry of Home Affairs (India)
 Ministry of Home Affairs (Indonesia)
 Ministry of Internal Affairs (Ingushetia)
 Ministry of Interior (Iran)
 Ministry of Interior (Iraq)
 Ministry of Interior (Israel)
 Ministry of Public Security (Israel)
 Ministry of the Interior (Italy)
 Ministry of Internal Affairs and Communications (Japan)
 Ministry of Interior (Jordan)
 Ministry of Internal Affairs (Kabardino-Balkaria)
 Ministry of Internal Affairs (Kalmykia)
 Ministry of Internal Affairs (Karachay-Cherkessia)
 Ministry of Internal Affairs of Kazakhstan
 Ministry of Internal Affairs (Khakassia)
 Ministry of Internal Affairs (Komi Republic)
 Ministry of the Interior and Safety (South Korea)
 Ministry of Interior (Kuwait)
 Ministry of the Interior (Kyrgyzstan)
 Ministry of Public Security (Laos)
 Ministry of Interior and Municipalities (Lebanon)
 Ministry of Interior (Libya)
 Ministry of the Interior (Lithuania)
 Ministry of Home Affairs (Malaysia)
 Ministry of Home Affairs (Maldives)
 Ministry of Internal Affairs (Mari El)
 Ministry of the Interior and Decentralization (Mauritania)
 Ministry of Internal Affairs (Moldova)
 Ministry of Internal Affairs (Montenegro)
 Ministry of Internal Affairs (Mordovia)
 Ministry of Home Affairs (Myanmar)
 Ministry of Home Affairs (Nepal)
 Ministry of the Interior and Kingdom Relations (Netherlands)
 Ministry of Justice and Security (Netherlands)
 Ministry of Interior, Public Safety and Decentralization (Niger)
 Federal Ministry of Interior (Nigeria)
 Ministry of Internal Affairs (North Macedonia)
 Ministry of Internal Affairs (North Ossetia–Alania)
 Ministry of Interior (Oman)
 Ministry of Interior (Pakistan)
 Ministry of the Interior (Peru)
 Ministry of Interior and Administration (Poland)
 Ministry of Internal Administration (Portugal)
 Ministry of Public Security (Quebec)
 Ministry of Internal Affairs (Republic of Karelia)
 Ministry of Interior (Republika Srpska)
 Ministry of Internal Affairs (Romania)
 Ministry of Internal Affairs (Russia)
 Ministry of Internal Affairs (Sakha Republic)
 Ministry of Interior (Saudi Arabia)
 Ministry of Internal Affairs (Serbia)
 Ministry of Public Administration and Local Self-Government (Serbia)
 Ministry of Home Affairs (Singapore)
 Ministry of the Interior (Slovakia)
 Ministry of the Interior (Slovenia)
 Ministry of Interior and Federal Affairs (Somalia)
 Ministry of Internal Affairs (South Sudan)
 Ministry of the Interior (Spain)
 Ministry of Home Affairs (Sri Lanka)
 Ministry of Internal Affairs, Wayamba Development and Cultural Affairs (Sri Lanka)
 Ministry of Interior (Syria)
 Ministry of the Interior (Taiwan)
 Ministry of Internal Affairs (Tajikistan)
 Ministry of Home Affairs (Tanzania)
 Ministry of Internal Affairs (Tatarstan)
 Ministry of Interior (Thailand)
 Ministry of Internal Affairs of Transnistria
 Ministry of the Interior (Tunisia)
 Ministry of the Interior (Turkey)
 Ministry of Internal Affairs (Turkmenistan)
 Ministry of Internal Affairs (Tuva)
 Ministry of Internal Affairs (Udmurtia)
 Ministry of Internal Affairs (Uganda)
 Ministry of Internal Affairs (Ukraine)
 Ministry of Internal Affairs (Uzbekistan)
 Ministry of Interior, Justice and Peace (Venezuela)
 Ministry of Home Affairs (Vietnam)
 Ministry of Public Security (Vietnam)
 Ministry of Home Affairs (Zambia)
 Ministry of Home Affairs (Zimbabwe)

Named "department" 
 Department of Home Affairs (Australia)
 Department of Justice (Ireland)
 Department of Home Affairs (Isle of Man)
 Department of Internal Affairs (New Zealand)
 Department of the Interior and Local Government (Philippines)
 Department of Home Affairs (South Africa)
 Department of Police (South Africa)
 Department of Homeland Security (Spain)
 Federal Department of Home Affairs (Switzerland)
 Department of Home, Prohibition and Excise (Tamil Nadu)
 Department of Homeland Security (United States)
 Department of Home and Confidential (Uttar Pradesh)
 Department of Home (West Bengal)

Other names 
 Federal Public Service Interior (Belgium)
 Public Safety Canada
 Directorate-General for Migration and Home Affairs (European Union)
 Home Affairs Bureau (Hong Kong)
 Secretariat of the Interior (Mexico)
 Secretariat of State of Security (Spain)
 Home Office (United Kingdom)

Historical

Named "ministry" 
 Ministry of the Interior and Justice (Colombia)
 Ministry of the Interior (Czechoslovakia)
 Ministry of Interior and Health (Denmark)
 Ministry of Internally Displaced Persons from the Occupied Territories, Accommodation and Refugees of Georgia
 Ministry of the Interior (Hawaii)
 Ministry of Home Affairs (Japan)
 Ministry of Internal Security (Malaysia)
 Ministry of the Interior (Ottoman Empire)
 Ministry of Interior (Poland)
 Ministry of Public Security (Poland)
 Ministry of Police of the Russian Empire
 Ministry of Interior and Defence (Singapore)
 Ministry of Public Safety and Security (South Korea)
 Ministry of Security and Public Administration (South Korea)
 Ministry of Internal Affairs (Soviet Union)
 Ministry of the Interior (Yugoslavia)

Named "department" 
 Department of Home Affairs (1901–1916) (Australia)
 Department of Home Affairs (1928–1932) (Australia)
 Department of Home Affairs (1977–1980) (Australia)
 Department of Home Affairs and Environment (Australia)
 Department of Home and Territories (Australia)
 Department of Home Security (Australia)
 Department of the Interior (1932–1939) (Australia)
 Department of the Interior (1939–1972) (Australia)

See also 
 Home Affairs (disambiguation)
 Interior minister

 
Internal Affairs